Manon Hily (born January 24, 1994, in Aix-en-Provence) is a French rock climber, sport climber and nurse. In August 2022, she took part in the European Championships in Munich and got a bronze medal in Lead behind Janja Garnbret and Jessica Pilz.

Outside, she regurlarly climbs  routes in places like Buoux or Céüse in France, or Margalef in Spain.

Besides climbing, she works as a nurse in the South of France.

Rankings

European championships

References 

French rock climbers
1994 births
Living people
Female climbers
Sportspeople from Aix-en-Provence